Tadeusz Godyń (born 16 July 1944) is a Polish wrestler. He competed in two events at the 1968 Summer Olympics.

References

External links
 

1944 births
Living people
Polish male sport wrestlers
Olympic wrestlers of Poland
Wrestlers at the 1968 Summer Olympics
People from Dąbrowa Górnicza
Sportspeople from Silesian Voivodeship